Conus devorsinei is a species of sea snail, a marine gastropod mollusk in the family Conidae, the cone snails, cone shells or cones.

These snails are predatory and venomous. They are capable of "stinging" humans.

Description
The length of the shell varies between 29 mm and 37 mm.

Distribution
This marine species of cone snail is endemic to Australia and occurs off Queensland

References

 Petuch E., Berschauer D. & Poremski A. (2015). Additions to the cone shell faunas of Australia and Aruba (Conidae, Conilithidae). The Festivus. 47(4): 219-228. page(s): 220, figs 1A-C

External links
 

devorsinei
Gastropods described in 2015
Gastropods of Australia